Borboniella rosacea is a species of moth of the family Tortricidae. It is found on Mauritius in the Indian Ocean.

References

Moths described in 1960
Borboniella